Samuel Terrill Brandon (born July 5, 1979) is a former American football safety. He was drafted in 2002 in the fourth round (131st overall) by the Denver Broncos after playing college football for UNLV. He played five seasons in the NFL, all of which were for the Broncos.

References

1979 births
Living people
American football safeties
Denver Broncos players
Players of American football from Ohio
Sportspeople from Toledo, Ohio
UNLV Rebels football players